The Agriocnemidinae are a subfamily of the Coenagrionidae family of damselflies. Damselflies in this subfamily are very small in size. The five genera contain 63 species.

Coenagrionidae